Gormiti: The Invincible Lords of Nature (Italian: Gormiti: Gli Invincibili Signori della Natura), later changed to Gormiti: The Lords of Nature Return!, is a toy property based primarily on -tall non-articulated mini figures with a trading card game play aspect. The toys were created in Italy in 2005 by Grani & Partners/Giochi Preziosi.

Toys 

Gormiti is the name of plastic monsters mini figures, sold together with training cards containing a description of the same character. There are different game modes, and they are used by 4–8 years old children for free play and by adults as collection pieces.

According to the mythology, Gormiti are the warriors of the island of Gorm, divided into two great armies (Good and Evil) in a The Lord of the Rings-like set. The two armies are in turn divided into various peoples, usually tied to a natural element (People of the Sea, People of Lava ...) that characterizes appearance and powers.

The mechanics of sale is similar to that of the figurines: the sale in closed sachets does not allow the choice, and involves the purchase of duplication which in turn feed a phenomenon of exchange. The remarkable success has led to the spread of a large secondary market: figurines, games and other children's products marked "Gormiti", dedicated magazines, DVDs and a theatrical show.

Previously, in the 80s, the Giochi Preziosi distributed static figures of plastic sachets with similar aims, called Exogini, which were also a big hit. In that case it was however an Italianisation of existing static figures inspired by the Kinnikuman manga and anime, based on space wrestler. These figurines were similar to those produced in the US and Japan, except for the difference of the names of the characters, and the plastic used, harder, and similar to that used for the regular Gormiti.

TV series 
The first television series, Gormiti, was co-produced by Giochi Preziosi and Marathon Media and based on the original Gormiti characters. It was broadcast for the first time on Italia 1 and Canal J from 27 October 2008. It started on October 5, 2009, on Cartoon Network in the United States, and Latin America on Disney XD of the year 2011. It consisted of three seasons, Gormiti: The Lords of Nature Return!, Gormiti:  The Supreme Eclipse Era! and Gormiti: The Neorganic Evolution. On January 3, 2011, Giochi Preziosi launched its series in Brazil, where it is the number one show on TV Globinho. Gormiti has been well known among boys in Brazil, long before the television show appeared.  There are already over 200 Gormiti licensed toys on the market in Brazil. The series got good ratings worldwide and positive reviews.

A second series, Gormiti Nature Unleashed, produced in CGI, began airing in Italy in 2012. Apart from the setting and some characters, it is unrelated to the first TV series.

A third series, Gormiti, began airing in 2018.

Video game 
Owing to Giochi Preziosi's investment in the platform, Engine Software developed three Gormiti video games for the DigiBlast handheld between 2006 and 2007.

A Gormiti: Lords of Nature video game for the Nintendo DS and the Wii was released by Konami in September 2010, and is heavily based on season one of the cartoon.

References

External links 
Il Mondo del Bambino | www.giochipreziosi.it Official corporate site of Giochi Preziosi, creators of Gormiti.

2000s toys
2010s toys
Action figures
Keshi
Products introduced in 2005
Collectible card games